Sucrea is a genus of Brazilian plants in the grass family.

Species
 Sucrea maculata Soderstr. - Rio de Janeiro, Espírito Santo
 Sucrea monophylla Soderstr. - Bahia
 †Sucrea sampaiana (Hitchc.) Soderstr. - Espírito Santo†

References

Bambusoideae genera
Endemic flora of Brazil
Grasses of Brazil
Flora of the Atlantic Forest
Flora of Bahia
Flora of Espírito Santo
Flora of Rio de Janeiro (state)
Bambusoideae